Gymnopilus caerulovirescens is a species of mushroom in the family Hymenogastraceae.

See also

List of Gymnopilus species

caerulovirescens